Liana is a female given name. It is a short form of Eliana, Juliana, Liliana, Liyana and other names that end in -liana. It can also be a botanical name derived from Liana.

Notable people known by the name include:

Liana Drahová, Slovak figure skater
Liana Kanelli, Greek journalist
Liana Kerzner, Canadian YouTuber
Liana Liberato, American actress
Liana Fiol Matta, Associate Justice of the Supreme Court of Puerto Rico
Liana Mesa, Cuban volleyball player
Liana Nella-Potiropoulou, Greek architect
Liana Orfei, Italian actress and circus artist
Liana Șerbescu, Romanian pianist

Feminine given names
Given names derived from plants or flowers